Oleksiy Mazikin (born 16 February 1975) is a Ukrainian boxer best known to win the silver medal at the 2001 World Championships in the Men's Super Heavyweight division.

Amateur
Mazikin was a successful amateur but kept losing to southpaws.
At the Olympics 2000 he lost to southpaw Audley Harrison, at the World Championships 2001 where he achieved his best result beating Alexander Povetkin 36:30 and Pedro Carrión he lost the final to southpaw Ruslan Chagaev.

At the Olympics 2004 he beat Aliaksandr Apanasionak and was defeated by southpaw Roberto Cammarelle.

Amateur Highlights
2000 competed as a Super Heavyweight at the 2000 Olympics in Sydney.
Defeated Angus Shelford (New Zealand) PTS (19-5)
Lost to Audley Harrison (Great Britain) PTS (9-19)
2001 2nd place at the World Championships in Belfast
Defeated Pedro Carrion (Cuba) PTS (26-20)
Lost to Ruslan Chagaev (Uzbekistan) RTD-2
2001 4th place at the Goodwill Games 2001 in Brisbane.
Lost to Alexander Povetkin (Russia) PTS (6-15) (Semifinals)
Lost to Pedro Carrion (Cuba) PTS (10-14) (Third place Bout)
2004 competed at the 2004 Olympics in Athens. Results were:
Defeated Aliaksandr Apanasionak (Belarus) PTS (23-5)
Lost to Roberto Cammarelle (Italy) PTS (21-23)

Pro
He turned pro in 2005. He lost to compatriot Taras Bidenko on points  and was KOd in the first round by amateur superstar Odlanier Solis.

Professional boxing record

External links
2001 world championships
 
 sports-reference

Heavyweight boxers
Boxers at the 2000 Summer Olympics
Boxers at the 2004 Summer Olympics
Olympic boxers of Ukraine
1975 births
Living people
National University of Kharkiv alumni
Ukrainian male boxers
AIBA World Boxing Championships medalists
Competitors at the 2001 Goodwill Games
Sportspeople from Kharkiv